Clare Samuel Hunter (December 1, 1886 – April 8, 1940) was an American football and basketball coach. He served as at Michigan State Normal College—now known as Eastern Michigan University in Ypsilanti, Michigan for one season, in 1909, compiled a record of 2–4. Hunter was also the head basketball coach at Michigan State Normal from 1909 to 1911.

Hunter was an alumnus of the University of Michigan as well as Michigan State Normal. During his time at Eastern Michigan, he resided at 119 North Adams Street at Ypsilanti. He later resided in Boise, Idaho, where he died in 1940.

Head coaching record

References

External links
 

1886 births
1940 deaths
Eastern Michigan Eagles football coaches
Eastern Michigan Eagles men's basketball coaches
Eastern Michigan University alumni
University of Michigan alumni
Sportspeople from Boise, Idaho
Sportspeople from Ypsilanti, Michigan
Coaches of American football from Michigan
Basketball coaches from Michigan